Ann Mary Hamilton was an English gothic and romantic novelist. Her work mixed the gothic and domestic and were unusual in that her villainous characters tended to be reformed by the compassion of others, rather than destroyed by their own darker urges..

Bibliography

 The Forest of St Bernardo (1806)
 The Irishwoman in London (1810)
 The Adventures of a Seven-Shilling Piece (1811)
 Montalva (or Annals of Guilt) (1811)
 A Winter at St James's (1811)
 The Monk's Daughter (1812)
 The Maiden Wife (1813)

References

External sites
 Corvey Women Writers on the Web author page

English women novelists
Year of death missing
Year of birth missing
19th-century English women writers
19th-century British writers
English romantic fiction writers